Choice of Weapon is the ninth album by the British rock band The Cult. The album was initially planned for release in 2011, but the release date was pushed back to May 2012. It was initially released on 18 May in Europe, before being released in the UK on 21 May and then in the US the following day. Recording sessions for Choice of Weapon began in March 2011 with Chris Goss, who produced the 2010 Capsule EPs. The sessions took place at studios in New York City, Los Angeles, California, and the "California desert". The album was finished in January 2012. During the recording sessions, Bob Rock teamed up with The Cult for the first time since 2001's Beyond Good and Evil and co-produced Choice of Weapon. Choice of Weapon was named iTunes "Rock Album of the Year" in 2012.

This album marks the first and, so far, only time the band did not make any personnel changes over two consecutive albums. However, it would end up being their final album with bassist Chris Wyse.

Background and recording
After a four-year hiatus, The Cult returned in 2006 and released the studio album Born into This in 2007. Although Born into This sold well, The Cult were dropped from Roadrunner Records, and in July 2009, frontman Ian Astbury stated that The Cult would not make any more albums. Asked in September 2009 why The Cult would not make another album, Astbury replied, "It's a dead format; we don't have the attention span for albums. By the time you put it out, it's already been leaked. It's a year-and-a-half worth's of work down the fucking tubes. We need to put out bite-sized chunks." Instead of releasing albums, The Cult released two EPs, titled Capsule 1 and Capsule 2, released in September and November 2010 respectively and the band toured to support them.

During The Cult's concert at the Hammersmith Apollo in London on 21 January 2011, Astbury declared that The Cult would be recording a new album directly after the tour. They announced that they would be working with Chris Goss, who performed with Masters of Reality as a supporting act the same evening. On 11 March 2011, it was announced that The Cult were back in the studio recording the album with Goss. By May, the band had been writing and recording new demos at its Witch Mountain studio hideaway in the Hollywood Hills, and began recording a new album at Hollywood Recording Studios. In October 2011, bassist Chris Wyse stated the album was almost finished and expected to be released in April 2012. Wyse also described it as a "Zep/Stooges mix of energy." On 29 November 2011, it was announced that the album would be produced by Bob Rock, who provided the same role on Sonic Temple, The Cult and Beyond Good and Evil.

The first single from Choice of Weapon, titled "For the Animals", was made available for online streaming via the Rolling Stone website on 23 March 2012, and was released to radio on 26 March.

This album marks the only time the band did not make any personnel changes over two consecutive albums. However, it would end up being their final album with bassist Chris Wyse.

In October 2012, Weapon of Choice, a collection of ten demo tracks, was made available through iTunes.

Artwork
The cover of the album shows a Plains Indian shaman of an undisclosed tribe. Astbury said he had possession of this picture for many years, and selected it for the album cover to express his interest in indigenous cultures, which was cultivated at a very early age.

Reception

The album debuted at number 15 in Canada and number 36 in USA. In its first week of sales, the album gained the Number 1 spot on the U.K. Rock Chart on 27/05/2012 (according to the Radio 1 Official Chart).

Track listing
All songs written by Ian Astbury and Billy Duffy.
 "Honey from a Knife" - 3:06
 "Elemental Light" - 4:45
 "The Wolf" - 3:33
 "Life>Death" - 5:32
 "For the Animals" - 4:28
 "Amnesia" - 3:02
 "Wilderness Now" - 4:33
 "Lucifer" - 4:40
 "A Pale Horse" - 3:14
 "This Night in the City Forever" - 4:45

Bonus Tracks (Deluxe Edition) 
 "Every Man And Woman Is A Star" - 3:26
 "Embers" - 5:01
 "Until The Light Takes Us" - 4:19
 "Siberia" - 3:36

Personnel
The Cult
 Ian Astbury - lead vocals
 Billy Duffy - guitars, backing vocals
 Chris Wyse - bass
 John Tempesta - drums
Additional musicians
 Jamie Edwards - keyboards, strings
 Chris Goss - guitars, backing vocals
 A.J. Celi - backing vocals on "Honey from a Knife"

References

External links
 Choice of Weapon

Albums produced by Chris Goss
Albums produced by Bob Rock
The Cult albums
2012 albums
Cooking Vinyl albums